Corinthian (foaled March 7, 2003 in Kentucky) is an American Thoroughbred racehorse.

He was purchased at the Fasig-Tipton 2004 Saratoga yearling sale for $385,000 by the Centennial Farms racing partnership led by Donald V. Little Sr. of Ipswich, Massachusetts.

Trained by Jimmy Jerkens, Corinthian is best known for winning the 2007 Grade I Breeders' Cup Dirt Mile at Monmouth Park and the 2007 Metropolitan Handicap (Grade I) at Belmont Park.

At stud
Following his Metropolitan 'Cap win, Corinthian was retired to stud duty at Gainesway Farm, near Lexington, Kentucky. On November 19, 2013, it was announced that Corinthian would be moved to Pin Oak Lane Farm in New Freedom, Pennsylvania and continue standing at stud there. On December 2, 2017, Prince Lucky, a Pennsylvania bred son of Corinthian, owned by Daniel W. McConnell, Sr. won the Pennsylvania Nursery Stakes at Parx Racing. Prince Lucky went on to win the Gulfstream Park Handicap and Hal's Hope Stakes. Corinthian is also the sire of Smarty Jones Stakes winner Junebugred.

In July 2017, Corinthian was sold to Turkish interests to stand at Evicmen Harasi in Kemalpaşa in Turkey's İzmir Province.

External links
 Corinthian's pedigree and partial racing stats

Pedigree

References

2003 racehorse births
Racehorses bred in Kentucky
Racehorses trained in the United States
Breeders' Cup Dirt Mile winners
Thoroughbred family 5-h